The 2009 Croatian local elections were held on 17 May, with the second round held on 31 May where necessary.

The elections elected a total of 866 members of county assemblies and 51 members of the City Assembly of the City of Zagreb, as well as 2,206 members of city councils and 5,343 municipal councils. A total of 2,982 candidate lists with 46,324 candidates were submitted for 21 county assemblies and the City Assembly of the City of Zagreb, as well as for 126 city councils and 429 municipal councils. In addition, 429 municipal mayors and 435 deputy mayors, 126 city mayors and 194 deputy mayors, 21 prefects and 42 deputy prefects and mayor of the City of Zagreb with his deputies were elected. Kutjevo, Otok and Sveta Nedelja are cities where for the first time was elected city mayor instead municipal mayor.

Electoral system 
Councilors of regional and local council are elected by closed list proportional system with a number of seats depending on number of inhabitants in area. By law, municipalities with up to 3,000 inhabitants elect between 7 and 13 councilors, municipalities with between 3,000 and 10,000 councilors elect between 9 and 15 councilors, municipalities and cities with between 10,000 and 30,000 inhabitants elect between 13 and 19 councilors, cities with over 30,000 inhabitants elect between 19 and 35 councilors, while the City of Zagreb elects 51 councilors. Counties numbers between 31 and 51 councilors, regardless of population. The electoral threshold was set on 5%. The number of seats can differ from above mentioned because of special seats for national minorities that are given independently. County prefects, city and municipal mayors were elected directly by voters for the first time.

Election results

Counties

Cities

Elections in major cities 
2009 Zagreb local elections
2009 Split local elections

References

External links
 Official web site of the 2009 local elections at the Croatian State Election Commission

Elections in Croatia
2009 elections in Croatia
2009 in Croatia
Local elections in Croatia
May 2009 events in Europe